Roopesh Shetty is an actor who acts in Tulu, Kannada and Konkani films. He is also a radio jockey in Mangaluru and a model. He emerged as the Winner (Top Performer) of the Season 1 of Bigg Boss Kannada OTT.
 He also won Bigg Boss Kannada (season 9).

Early life
Roopesh Shetty was born 14 August 1991 in a Tulu-speaking Bunt family in Kasaragod, Kerala, India

Career
Roopesh Shetty started his career as a YouTuber where he started uploading Tulu comedy album songs. He then worked as an RJ and VJ in Mangaluru. He made his film debut in a supporting role in Dibbana Tulu movie. In 2015, he appeared as the main lead in Ice Cream Tulu movie. However, the movie did not do well at the box-office. He then made his Kannada debut with Danger Zone. This film also failed to reach maximum audiences. After appearing in several Kannada and Tulu films, his luck has been changed after the release of Girgit Tulu movie. Along with acting, he also directed that movie along with Rakesh Kadri. He also made Gamjaal Tulu Movie in 2021 which recovered its budget in the first three days of release.
In September 2022 he emerged as the winner of the Season 1 of Bigg Boss Kannada OTT.
 He also won Bigg Boss Kannada (season 9) in December 2022.

Filmography

As an actor

As a singer
 E Sala Cup Namde – Original, Sung in support of IPL team Royal Challengers Bangalore.

References

External links

Indian male film actors
Male actors in Kannada cinema
Male actors from Mangalore
People from Kasaragod district
1991 births
21st-century Indian male actors
Living people
Tulu people
Male actors in Tulu cinema
Male actors in Konkani cinema